Danielle Nicolet (born Danielle Diggs; November 24, 1973) is an American actress. She has made appearances on shows such as 3rd Rock from the Sun (1996–2001), Second Time Around (2004–05), The Starter Wife (2008), Family Tools (2013), Born Again Virgin (2015–16) and The Flash (2015–present).

Life and career
Nicolet began acting in the early 1990s, appearing in a recurring role on the ABC sitcom Family Matters. In 1996, she landed the role of Caryn on the NBC sitcom 3rd Rock from the Sun, which lasted until 2001. In 2005, Nicolet starred in the short-lived UPN sitcom Second Time Around. Entertainment Weekly named her the network's "breakout star" in review. After the series was canceled, she co-starred on the TNT medical drama, Heartland. That following year, Nicolet had regular role in the USA Network comedy-drama, The Starter Wife starring Debra Messing, the series also was canceled after one season. Nicolet has also guest starred on episodes of Stargate SG-1, Angel, The Bernie Mac Show, All of Us, CSI: Crime Scene Investigation, and Warehouse 13.

Nicolet appeared in various films including a small role as Samuel L. Jackson's character's teenage daughter in Loaded Weapon 1 (1993). She later had roles in Melting Pot (1998), opposite Paul Rodriguez and A Wonderful Night in Split (2004). In 2009, Nicolet starred opposite Cuba Gooding Jr. in the thriller Ticking Clock (2009). In 2011, she co-starred in the Syfy original film, Red Faction: Origins, based on the video game. She also voiced Shaundi in Saints Row: The Third and continued to voice her in Saints Row IV and Saints Row: Gat out of Hell. In 2013, she starred in the short-lived ABC comedy series, Family Tools. She later had the recurring role on the BET comedy series, The Game, and guest starred on Elementary.

In 2015, Nicolet guest starred in the first season of The CW's The Flash as Cecile Horton before being cast as the lead in TV One's first original comedy-drama series, Born Again Virgin. She also played the female lead, opposite Kevin Hart and Dwayne Johnson, in the action comedy film Central Intelligence, directed by Rawson Marshall Thurber. After Born Again Virgin ended its run, Nicolet returned to The Flash in a recurring role for the show's third and fourth seasons before being promoted to a series regular for the fifth season.

Filmography

Film

Television

Video games

References

External links 
 
 
 

20th-century American actresses
21st-century American actresses
Actresses from Ohio
African-American child actresses
American child actresses
African-American actresses
American film actresses
American television actresses
American video game actresses
American voice actresses
American people of Italian descent
Living people
People from Ashtabula, Ohio
1973 births
20th-century African-American women
20th-century African-American people
21st-century African-American women
21st-century African-American people